Karan Dev Kamboj is a Bharatiya Janata Party (BJP) politician and 2014-2019, former member of legislative assembly (MLA) of Haryana  state in India. He representsIndri constituency in the Haryana Legislative Assembly, and was sworn-in as minister of state transport of Haryana after BJP win in the Haryana Legislative Assembly election, 2014.

References

Bharatiya Janata Party politicians from Haryana
State cabinet ministers of Haryana
Haryana MLAs 2014–2019
Living people
Year of birth missing (living people)